Trego may refer to:

People
Peter Trego (born 1981), English cricketer who plays for Somerset
Reno W. Trego (1877–1961), member of the Wisconsin State Assembly
William B. T. Trego (1858–1909), American historical artist
Benjamin Tregoe (1927–2005), co-founder of Kepner–Tregoe (now TregoED), a management consulting firm
William Trego Webb (1847–1934), British educationist and author

Places
In the United States:
Trego County, Kansas
Trego Hot Springs, Nevada
Trego, Maryland
Trego, Montana
Trego, Wisconsin

Things
USS Trego (AKA-78), US navy Tolland class attack cargo ship

See also
Trego-Rohrersville Station, Maryland, census-designated place